FC Mayabeque is a Cuban football team based in the town of Güines.  In the 2013 season the club competed in the Campeonato Nacional de Fútbol de Cuba, the highest level of football in Cuba.

References

Football clubs in Cuba
Güines
Mayabeque Province